Qin Gang (born March 1966) is a Chinese diplomat and politician who has is currently a State Councilor of the People's Republic of China and the Minister of Foreign Affairs, making him China's second highest ranked diplomat after Chinese Communist Party (CCP) Politburo member Wang Yi. He previously served as Vice Minister of Foreign Affairs from 2018 to 2021 and most recently as Chinese Ambassador to the United States from 2021 to 2023.

Early life and education
Qin Gang was born in Tianjin in March 1966.

Qin received a Bachelor of Laws with a major in international politics from the University of International Relations in 1988.

Career
After his graduation from college, Qin worked as a staff member at the Beijing Service Bureau for Diplomatic Missions. In 1992, he entered China's Ministry of Foreign Affairs as attaché and Third Secretary at the Department of West European Affairs. Later, he worked at the Chinese Embassy in the United Kingdom as Secretary and Counselor from 1995 to 2005, and worked at the Foreign Ministry Information Department as the Deputy Director-General and spokesman from 2005 to 2010. 

In September 2010, Qin was appointed as the Envoy of the People's Republic of China to the United Kingdom. In December 2011, he returned to Beijing to serve as the director general of the Foreign Ministry Information Department. From 2014 to 2017, Qin served as the Director General of the Foreign Ministry Protocol Department. He became Assistant Minister of Foreign Affairs of China in 2017 and Vice Minister of Foreign Affairs of China in September 2018.

Ambassador to the United States 
In July 2021, Qin became the 11th Ambassador of the People's Republic of China to the United States, succeeding Cui Tiankai, pursuant to a National People's Congress Standing Committee decision.

On September 22, 2021, Qin advocated the CCP concept of whole-process people's democracy at a conference organized by U.S. think tanks the Carter Center and The George H.W. Bush Foundation for US-China Relations, stating, "Isn't it obvious that both China's people-center philosophy and President Lincoln's 'of the people, by the people, for the people' are for the sake of the people? [...] Shall we understand China's socialist whole-process democracy as this: from the people, to the people, with the people, for the people?"

In January 2022, in an interview with NPR, Qin called the Uyghur genocide "fabrications, lies and disinformation."

In April 2022, a special question and answer (Q&A) session between the three taikonauts of Shenzhou 13 aboard the Tiangong space station and American students was held in the Chinese Embassy in the United States, Washington, D.C. Qin served as the official host of the event.

In August 2022, Qin called the 2022 visit by Nancy Pelosi to Taiwan a "farce" and a "total political provocation."

Minister of Foreign Affairs 
Qin was appointed the 12th Minister of Foreign Affairs of China on December 30, 2022, and was removed from the post of Chinese ambassador to the United States of America on January 5, 2023.

Personal life
Qin is married. He has one son.

References

External links
 

1966 births
Living people
20th-century Chinese people
21st-century Chinese politicians
Ambassadors of China to the United States
Chinese Communist Party politicians from Tianjin
Delegates to the 20th National Congress of the Chinese Communist Party
Foreign Ministers of the People's Republic of China
Members of the 20th Central Committee of the Chinese Communist Party
Ministry of Foreign Affairs of the People's Republic of China officials
People's Republic of China politicians from Tianjin
Political office-holders in Hebei
University of International Relations alumni